The 2019–20 WBL season was the 70th season of the Women's Basketball League (WBL), the Dutch top tier for women's basketball teams.

The season was ended prematurely in March 2020 due to the COVID-19 pandemic.

Teams
Utrecht Cangeroes promoted to the league as winners of the 2018–19 Promotiedivise, and played its first-ever VBL season.

Arenas and locations 

Note: Table lists in alphabetical order.

Sponsored club names
As is common practice in European basketball, the following clubs carried the name of their sponsor this season:

Regular season

League table

Statistical leaders

References

Vrouwen Basketball League seasons
1
Netherlands